James Harvey Slater (December 28, 1826January 28, 1899) was a United States representative and Senator from Oregon. An Illinois native, Slater also served in the Oregon Territory's Legislature, then later the Oregon State Legislature, and was the owner of the Corvallis Union newspaper.

Early life
Born near Springfield, Illinois, in Sangamon County, Slater attended the local schools. In 1849 he moved to California in before settling in Corvallis, Oregon Territory in 1850. There Slater studied law and was admitted to the bar in 1854.

Politics
In Corvallis he was clerk of the district court of the Territory of Oregon for Benton County from 1853 to 1856. He was a member of the Territorial assembly in 1857–1858 and was a member of the Oregon House of Representatives in from 1859–1860. From 1858 to 1861 Slater published the Corvallis Union as both owner and editor. He also served as postmaster for Corvallis from 1859 to 1860 followed by law practice there until 1863 when he moved to Walla Walla, Washington. Slater then moved to Auburn, Oregon, before settling in the Eastern Oregon town of La Grande in 1866.

In La Grande he was district attorney for the fifth judicial district of Oregon in 1868, as well as a presidential elector on the Democratic ticket. He was elected as a Democrat to the Forty-second Congress (March 4, 1871 – March 3, 1873). Slater then returned to law practice in La Grande. He returned to politics in 1878 and was elected to the U.S. Senate and served from March 4, 1879 to March 3, 1885.

Later life and family
He resumed the practice of law in La Grande, Oregon and was a member of the State railroad commission from 1889 to 1891. In 1854 Slater married Elizabeth (Edna) Gray with whom he would father ten children including future Oregon Supreme Court justice Woodson T. Slater. James Harvey Slater died in La Grande in 1899 and was interred in the Masonic Cemetery.

References

External links

 

1826 births
1899 deaths
People from Springfield, Illinois
1868 United States presidential electors
District attorneys in Oregon
Democratic Party members of the Oregon House of Representatives
Members of the Oregon Territorial Legislature
Oregon postmasters
People from La Grande, Oregon
Democratic Party United States senators from Oregon
Oregon lawyers
19th-century American politicians
19th-century American lawyers
Democratic Party members of the United States House of Representatives from Oregon